The Karaftu caves are an ensemble of artificially cut rock chambers located between Saqqez and Divandarreh, Kurdistan Province, Iran. The cave complex dates back to the 3rd or 4th century BC and is of major importance due to its Greek inscription; "one of the very few examples preserved in situ" in Iran.

Alongside the Bisotun Herakles, it represents one of the only extant Seleucid rock-cut artworks.

The rock-cut cave complex dates to the Seleucid era, and likely served as a Seleucid garrison.

UNESCO 
This cave was registered as one of Iran's national monuments on February 10, 1940 with registration number 330. Also, this cave was registered in UNESCO's temporary world list on November 15, 2022.

Gallery

Notes

References

 Populated places in Kurdistan Province
 Landforms of Kurdistan Province
 Caves of Iran
Greek inscriptions
Seleucid Empire